Mala Noche (also known as Bad Night) is a 1986 American drama film based on Walt Curtis' autobiographical novel. It marked Gus Van Sant's directorial film debut, and stars Tim Streeter, Doug Cooeyate, Ray Monge, and Nyla McCarthy. The film was shot on 16 mm in black-and-white in Portland, Oregon.

Plot
The story follows relationship between Walt, a gay store clerk, and two younger Mexican boys, Johnny and Roberto Pepper. Walt and his female friend convince them to come over for dinner, but Johnny and Pepper have to return to their cheap hotel because another friend is locked out. Walt makes his first pass at Johnny by offering him $15 to sleep with him. Johnny refuses and runs to his hotel room, leaving Roberto locked out with nowhere to spend the night but Walt's. Settling for second best, Walt lies down next to Pepper and allows him on top for sex. However, he does not give up on trying to win over Johnny. The film progresses from there into not always clearly defined relationships, unbalanced by age, language, money, race and sex.

Roberto gets shot by the police.  Johnny successfully resists Walt's loving advances.

Cast
 Tim Streeter as Walt Curtis
 Doug Cooeyate as Johnny
 Ray Monge as Roberto Pepper
 Nyla McCarthy as Betty
 Don Chambers as himself
 Walt Curtis as George

Reception
Rotten Tomatoes gives the film a rating of 96% from 25 reviews with the consensus: "Mala Noche is a raw and gritty portrait of desire, doomed romance, and rejection -- and marks debuting director Gus Van Sant as a filmmaker with a gratifyingly personal touch."

References

External links
 
 
 
 
 Official French site
 Mala Noche: Other Love an essay by Dennis Lim at the Criterion Collection

1986 films
1980s English-language films
Films directed by Gus Van Sant
1986 drama films
Films set in Portland, Oregon
Films shot in Portland, Oregon
American LGBT-related films
1986 LGBT-related films
Films with screenplays by Gus Van Sant
American drama films
American black-and-white films
LGBT-related drama films
1986 directorial debut films
1988 drama films
1988 films
1980s American films